Sohail Abbas is a former professional field hockey player who has represented Pakistan national field hockey team since his debut on 28 February 1998 against India in a bilateral test series match. He scored his first international goal in the second match of the series off a penalty corner with the goal being the winner in the 2-1 win. He is the current all-time top goalscorer for Pakistan and in international men's field hockey with 348 goals in 315 appearances.

On 10 December 1998, Abbas scored his first international hat-trick against Hong Kong at the 1998 Asian Games. He has scored 23 international hat-tricks a world record and on one occasion he scored seven goals in a single match which puts him among the only six Pakistani players to have scored a double hat-trick in international matches. He finished the calendar year 1999 with 60 goals breaking the 58 goals world record of Paul Litjens of Netherlands. On 18 September 2000 Abbas became the quickest to complete 100 international goals when he scored a hat-trick against the Great Britain at the 2000 Sydney Olympics. He did so in a record period of two years, six months and 18 days in 83 appearances.

On 24 January 2002 Abbas scored a goal in the 2-2 draw against Australia in a six nations invitational tournament in Kuala Lumpur taking his tally to 151 goals, thus becoming his country's all-time top scorer, surpassing the record of 150 goals set by Hassan Sardar. He scored twice in a thrilling 5-6 win against Argentina on 17 August at the 2003 Hockey Champions Trophy completing his 200 international goals becoming the first and as of now the only Pakistani player to do so. On 8 October 2004 Abbas scored his 268th international goal against India at Amritsar in a bilateral test series match becoming the highest goalscorer in international hockey surpassing Paul Litjens's 267 goals for Netherlands, a record which he currently holds.
Abbas has participated in the two most prestigious tournaments in international field hockey seven times: FIH Hockey World Cups in 1998, 2002 2006 and 2010 and three Olympics in 2000, 2004 and 2012, scoring in all of them while being the top scorer at the 2002 World Cup and 2004 Olympics with 10 and 11 goals respectively. He has also appeared in the former Hockey Champions Trophy organized by FIH eight times from 1998 to 2011 being the top scorer for Pakistan in the competition with 41 goals. He has scored 54 goals against India, most goals against a single opponent. He has scored 74 international goals at the Malaysia National Hockey Stadium in Kuala Lumpur, his most at a single venue.

Goals 
As of last match played on 9 August 2012

Hat-tricks

Statistics

References 

National team
Field hockey